Vermileo is a genus of wormlions in the family Vermileonidae.

Species
Vermileo ater Stuckenberg, 1965
Vermileo cylindraceus (Costa, 1844)
Vermileo comstocki Wheeler, 1918 (sierra wormlion)
Vermileo dowi Wheeler, 1931
Vermileo fascipennis (Williston, 1895)
Vermileo immaculatus Carles-tolrá & Cuesta-Seguro, 2020
Vermileo nigriventris Strobl, 1906
Vermileo niloticus Edwards, 1935
Vermileo opacus (Coquillett, 1904)
Vermileo tibialis (Walker, 1852)
Vermileo vermileo (Linnaeus, 1758)
Vermileo willetti Leon, 1938

References

Diptera of North America
Diptera of Africa
Brachycera genera